Ploskoye is a rural locality (a khutor) in Volokonovsky District, Belgorod Oblast, Russia. The population was 64 as of 2010. There are 2 streets.

Geography 
Ploskoye is located 20 km northeast of Volokonovka (the district's administrative centre) by road. Repyevka is the nearest rural locality.

References 

Rural localities in Volokonovsky District